Yeylan may refer to:
 Yeylan-e Jonubi Rural District
 Yeylan-e Shomali Rural District